The Third Eye is a 1929 British silent crime film directed by Maclean Rogers and starring Dorothy Seacombe and Hayford Hobbs. The screenplay concerns a financier's plot to rob banks.

Premise
As part of a plan to rob banks, a financier insists on installing new television technology in several branches.

Cast
 Dorothy Seacombe as Marion Carstairs
 Ian Harding as Tom Kennedy
 Hayford Hobbs as Henry Fenton
 John F. Hamilton as Jim Carstairs
 Cameron Carr as Inspector
 Jean Jay as Flash Annie
 Beatrice Bell as Mrs. Carstairs
 Syd Ellery as Piggott
 Harry J. Worth as Commissioner Cosgrove
 Patrick Ludlow as Arthur Redfern
 Eric Wilton as Sir James Woodridge

References

External links

1929 films
1929 crime films
British crime films
British silent feature films
Films set in England
Films directed by Maclean Rogers
Films shot at Nettlefold Studios
British black-and-white films
1920s English-language films
1920s British films